Splicing factor 3A subunit 2 is a protein that in humans is encoded by the SF3A2 gene.

Function 

This gene encodes subunit 2 of the splicing factor 3a protein complex. The splicing factor 3a heterotrimer includes subunits 1, 2 and 3 and is necessary for the in vitro conversion of 15S U2 snRNP into an active 17S particle that performs pre-mRNA splicing. Subunit 2 interacts with subunit 1 through its amino-terminus while the single zinc finger domain of subunit 2 plays a role in its binding to the 15S U2 snRNP. Subunit 2 may also function independently of its RNA splicing function as a microtubule-binding protein.

Interactions 

SF3A2 has been shown to interact with DDX46.

References

Further reading